The Watchung Conference was a high school sports association under the jurisdiction of the New Jersey State Interscholastic Athletic Association (NJSIAA). The conference consisted of eleven public high schools covering Essex County, Hudson County and Union County in northern New Jersey. In 2009, the conference was disbanded. The Essex County schools joined the Super Essex Conference, the Union County schools joined the Union County Interscholastic Athletic Association, and the Hudson County schools joined the temporary North Jersey Tri-County Conference, before joining their Hudson County schools in reviving the Hudson County Interscholastic Athletic Association in 2010.

Sports 
Fall Sports: Cross Country, Field Hockey, Football, Girls' Tennis, Soccer, Volleyball
Winter Sports: Basketball, Hockey, Swimming, Track & Field, Wrestling
Spring Sports: Baseball, Boys' Tennis, Golf, Lacrosse, Softball, Track & Field, Volleyball

Member schools

External links
Watchung Conference website

Essex County, New Jersey
Sports in Hudson County, New Jersey
New Jersey high school athletic conferences
Union County, New Jersey